Scott Howell (born 10 May 1958) is a former Australian rules footballer who played with Carlton in the VFL during the early 1980s.

Howell debuted for Carlton in the 1980 finals series and played in Carlton's premiership team the following season. This created history by completing three premierships in successive generations for the Howells with his father 'Chooka' Howell and grandfather Jack P. Howell both being premiership players.

He played with Sandringham after leaving Carlton.

External links

Blueseum profile

1958 births
Living people
Carlton Football Club players
Carlton Football Club Premiership players
Sandringham Football Club players
Australian rules footballers from Victoria (Australia)
One-time VFL/AFL Premiership players